Dave Heeke (born October 8, 1963) is an American university sports administrator who currently serves as athletic director at the University of Arizona.

College
Heeke earned a bachelor's degree in 1985 from Albion College, where he was a member of the club hockey team and co-captain of the baseball team, then earning a master's degree from Ohio State University in 1987.

Career
Heeke served 18 years at the University of Oregon, initially holding a role boosting the program's support in Portland. He became athletics director of Central Michigan University on January 16, 2006, and served 11 years in the role. Heeke then became Director of Athletics at the University of Arizona on April 1, 2017. His five-year contract began with a $500,000 annual salary plus incentives, escalating annually.

Family
Heeke and his wife, Liz, are parents to three boys, Ryan, Max and Zach.

See also
List of NCAA Division I athletic directors

References

External links
 Central Michigan profile
 Arizona profile

Living people
Albion Britons baseball players
Albion Britons men's ice hockey players
Ohio State University alumni
Central Michigan Chippewas athletic directors
Arizona Wildcats athletic directors
1963 births